Bangor 1876 Football Club are an amateur Welsh football club from the City of Bangor, Gwynedd, who play in the Ardal NW League which is at the third tier of football in Wales.

History

Formation of the club
In April 2019 the Supporters Association of Bangor City voted overwhelmingly to create a breakaway club in order to protect football in the city, given the recent history of the club under VSM (Vaughan Sports Management). They stated, “We want fans to reconnect with each other and restore the pride and feeling of being a supporter of our historic club. The new club is a creative and positive solution for an ever-changing and precarious situation. We are not disowning Bangor City FC or its history, the club is OURS, it belongs to the fans and local community. “Owners” will come and go but the people remain. Keep the faith.”

An application was submitted in May 2019 to the Football Association of Wales to enter the new club in the Welsh football league system. In June it was confirmed that a Supporters' trust was being set up and would start trading immediately after an application to the Financial Conduct Authority had been successfully made and approved. Later that month, the name and crest of the new club, Clwb Pêl-Droed Bangor 1876 Football Club, was announced and in June 2019, the club announced the formation of Bangor 1876 Women's FC with the intention to enter teams in various age categories in two girls' leagues in North Wales. The also club confirmed they would be playing their home matches at Treborth, Bangor University.

First season
On 19 June it was announced by the FAW that the club would compete in the tier 5 Gwynedd League for the 2019–20 season and the first manager was announced as Mel Jones, with Dylan Williams confirmed as his assistant. Former Llandudno and Caernarfon Town manager Iwan Williams was also appointed as Director of Football.

The club's inaugural match was against fellow fan-owned team FC United of Manchester and the first competitive match, which took place in the Gwynedd League, saw the club record a 4–1 away victory against Ogwen Tigers on 10 August 2019.  A successful first season saw the club  leading the league, with a 100 percent win ratio when the season was suspended due to the Covid-19 pandemic in March 2020. They were crowned league champions following the announcement that all Welsh football seasons would finish with a table decided on a 'points per game' basis.

Second season
The club joined the newly formed North Wales Coast West Football League in the tier 4 Premier Division when announced in 2020. The inaugural season was cancelled due to the ongoing pandemic and instead started in August 2021.  The club finished as divisional runners up in the 2021–22 season and on 9 June 2022, it was announced that the club had been promoted to the tier 3 Ardal NW League for the 2022–23 season via the vacancy route.

Promotion to the Third Tier

In June 2022, The Football Association of Wales announced that four clubs, including parent club Bangor City, would not be competing in the Ardal NW League in the upcoming 2022-23 season. As a result, Bangor 1876 applied for, and ultimately successfully achieved, a place in the NW league for the forthcoming season. The club won their opening match in the third tier against Rhydymwyn FC 8-1.

Current squad
As of 25 January 2023

Club staff
 First team managers: Michael Johnston & Mel Jones
 First team coach: Nigel Barry
 First team coach: Chris Jones
 First team goalkeeper coach: Mervyn Williams
 Director of Football:

Honours
Gwynedd League – Champions: 2019–20
North Wales Coast West Football League Premier Division – Runners-up: 2021–22
North Wales Coast West Football League Premier Division Cup – Winners: 2021–22

Records
 Record home league win: 14–0 vs Bethesda Athletic, Gwynedd League, 15 October 2019
 Record home cup win: 13–0 vs Llanystumdwy, Bob Owen Memorial Shield First Round, 16 November 2019 
 Record away league win: 0–6 vs Caergybi, Gwynedd League, 14 December 2019
 Record away cup win: 1–3 vs Llanelwy Athletic, North Wales Coast FA Junior Challenge Cup First Round, 12 October 2019
 Record home league attendance: 440 vs Bontnewydd, Gwynedd League, 30 December 2019

References

External links
 Bangor 1876 official club website
 Bangor 1876 official Twitter page
 Bangor 1876 Women's official Twitter page
 Bangor 1876 official Facebook page

 
Sport in Gwynedd
Football clubs in Wales
Association football clubs established in 2019
Sport in Bangor, Gwynedd
2019 establishments in Wales
Fan-owned football clubs
Bangor City F.C.
Gwynedd League clubs
North Wales Coast Football League clubs
Ardal Leagues clubs